The East Cork Junior A Football Championship (known for sponsorship reasons as the Michael O'Connor Motor Factors East Cork Junior Football Championship) is an annual Gaelic football competition organised by the Imokilly Board of the Gaelic Athletic Association since 1927 for junior Gaelic football teams in East Cork.

The series of games begin in March, with the championship culminating with the final in the autumn. The championship includes a knock-out stage and a "back door" for teams defeated in the first round.

The East Cork Junior Championship is an integral part of the wider Cork Junior Football Championship. The winners of the East Cork championship join their counterparts from the other seven divisions to contest the county championship.

15 clubs currently participate in the East Cork Championship. The title has been won at least once by 17 different clubs. The all-time record-holders are Glanmire, who have won a total of 20 titles. 

Cobh are the title-holders after defeating Castlemartyr by 4-11 to 2-09 in the 2022 championship final.

The championship

Overview

The East Cork Junior Championship is effectively a knockout tournament with pairings drawn at random — there are no seeds.

Each match is played as a single leg. If a match ends as a draw there is a period of extra time, however, if both sides are still level at the end of extra time a replay takes place and so on until a winner is found.

Teams

Roll of honour

Records

By decade

The most successful team of each decade, judged by number of East Cork Junior Football Championship titles, is as follows:

 1920s: 1 each for Cobh (1927), Midleton (1928) and Glanmire (1929)
 1930s: 6 for Glanmire (1930-32-33-34-36-37)
 1940s: 3 each for Youghal (1940-41-45)
 1950s: 4 each for Glanmire (1950-51-57-58) and Cobh (1953-54-55-56)
 1960s: 5 for Glanmire (1964-64-65-66-68)
 1970s: 4 for Glenville (1972-73-78-79)
 1980s: 4 each for Aghada (1980-81-83-89) and Castlemartyr (1982-85-86-87)
 1990s: 2 each for Castlemartyr (1990-91), Carrigtwohill (1993-97) and Fr. O'Neill's (1996-98)
 2000s: 3 each for Cloyne (2001-08-09) and Erin's Own (2002-03-05)
 2010s: 3 for Glenbower Rovers (2012-13-15)

Gaps

Top ten longest gaps between successive championship titles:
 34 years: Cobh (1988-2022)
 28 years: Cobh (1960-1988)
 25 years: Youghal (1959-1984)
 25 years: Cloyne (1976-2001)
 18 years: Midleton (1974-1992)
 17 years: Cobh (1927-1944)
 16 years: Glenville (1979-1995)
 15 years: Youghal (1984-1999)
 14 years: Bride Rovers (2007-2021)
 13 years: Glenville (1948-1961)
 13 years: Midleton (1949-1962)
 12 years: Youghal (1999-2011)

2022 Championship

Group stage 
Group A

Group B

Group C

Knockout stage

See also
 East Cork Junior A Hurling Championship

External links

 East Cork GAA website

East Cork Junior A Football Championship